Throwing Copper is the third studio album by American alternative rock band Live, released on April 26, 1994, on former MCA Records subsidiary Radioactive Records. It was produced by Jerry Harrison of Talking Heads and was recorded at Pachyderm Recording Studio. Throwing Copper has generally been regarded as Live's best album, having sold over 8 million copies and certified 8× platinum by the Recording Industry Association of America.

Cover art
The cover art is a painting by Scottish artist Peter Howson titled Sisters of Mercy. On September 23, 2005, it was sold for $186,000 by Christie's in New York. The painting is oil on canvas and measures .

25th anniversary reissue
In May 2019, the band announced a 25th-anniversary reissue of Throwing Copper, which was released on July 19. The reissue contains three bonus tracks: "Hold Me Up", which was recorded during the original Throwing Copper sessions and later heard in the 2008 comedy Zack and Miri Make a Porno but was not officially released; "We Deal in Dreams", which had been released as a single off the band's 2004 compilation album Awake: The Best of Live; and "Susquehanna", another previously unreleased track originally recorded in 1993, though it had been written during recording sessions for the band's first studio album, Mental Jewelry.

Critical reception
Throwing Copper has typically been regarded as Live's strongest album. A Rolling Stone review stated that the band "strive for an epic sound" and successfully execute on that goal; retrospective reviews have been similarly positive, with the Jakarta Post describing the album as "a solid beast from front to back" and uDiscoverMusic characterizing it as "challenging, yet commendably powerful". The instrumentation on the album has been generally praised: Rolling Stone considered the musicians to be "expert players [who] drop musical smart bombs with unerring precision", and the Jakarta Post referred to the music as "absolutely dynamic and catchy". Singer Ed Kowalczyk was applauded for his vocal performance as well, with a retrospective Stereogum review noting his ability to "raise his voice from a plaintive hush to a clenched roar".

The lyrics of the album received more mixed reviews. The Jakarta Post felt that Throwing Copper "managed to push earnestness and wild esotericism as far as it could go without feeling resoundingly cheesy", but Gina Boldman of AllMusic was more negative, stating that the album's "melodrama [is] a bit much". Stereogum described Kowalczyk's lyrics as "mystic gibberish" that nevertheless featured "memorably inscrutable turns of phrase".

Track listing

The tracks "Pillar of Davidson" and "Horse" were not included on the original 1994 vinyl version. They were, however, included on the 2012 vinyl reissue on Music on Vinyl, which also added "Horse" to the track listing. The 2019 vinyl re-release was a double album, featuring the bonus tracks and "Horse" on the D-side.

Personnel
Adapted credits from the liner notes of Throwing Copper.

Live
Ed Kowalczyk – lead vocals, rhythm guitar
Chad Taylor – lead guitar, backing vocals
Patrick Dahlheimer – bass
Chad Gracey – drums, backing vocals

Technical personnel
Jerry Harrison – production
Lou Giordano – engineering, recording
Ted Jensen – mastering
Gary Kurfirst – executive production
Tom Lord-Alge – mixing

Charts

Weekly charts

Year-end charts

Decade-end charts

Singles

Certifications

References

1994 albums
Live (band) albums
Albums produced by Jerry Harrison
MCA Records albums